Jonathan Uptin (born 18 October 1971) is an Australian journalist. He is currently weeknight sport presenter on Nine News Queensland.

Career
Uptin has worked across Australia on a number of different platforms. After completing a communications degree at the University of Canberra, Uptin began his media career at Channel Nine in Sydney as an assistant to the chief of staff, before working as a news reporter with Prime Television and radio station 2GZ.

Uptin then joined the Nine Network, at the time Channel 8, as a sports reporter before becoming a sports presenter at NBN Television in Newcastle.

In 2000, he returned to Darwin and was appointed weeknight presenter of Eight National News and continued in this role during the conversion to Nine News. In September 2017, Nine News Darwin ceased production from the local Darwin studios, and Uptin moved to Brisbane where was appointed the co-presenter of twelve regional Queensland and Darwin bulletins with Samantha Heathwood. He remained in this position until February 2018, when a network reshuffle saw him move to presenting the weekend news on the metropolitan Nine News Queensland bulletin, as well as occasionally filling in for Wally Lewis on the sports segment. He is also occasionally a fill-in weeknight presenter on the bulletin, as well as on the national Weekend Today program.

In January 2023, Uptin was appointed as weeknight sport presenter on Nine News Queensland, replacing Wally Lewis who stepped down due to health reasons. His weekend news presenting role was subsequently taken over by Mia Glover.

References

External links
NineMSN

Nine News presenters
Living people
University of Canberra alumni
1971 births